Amazing Film Studio is a film production company founded by Adam Tsuei in 2012.

Filmography
 Tiny Times (2013)
 Tiny Times 2 (2013)
 Café. Waiting. Love (2014)
 The Tenants Downstairs (2016)

References 

Film production companies of Taiwan